Husarz may refer to:
Hussar
Towarzysz husarski